Francis Patrick (Frank) Connors (12 January 1888 – 6 November 1963) was an Australian politician and trade unionist. He was a Labor Party member of the New South Wales Legislative Assembly from 1930 until 1932, representing the electorate of Dulwich Hill.

Connors was born at Paterson, and educated at Morpeth in the Hunter Region. He was an engineer by profession, but began working as a union official during his 30s. Prior to entering politics, he served as assistant state secretary and an organiser of the Australasian Society of Engineers from 1924 until 1929. He was elected to the Legislative Assembly for Dulwich Hill at the 1930 state election, defeating Nationalist John Ness, but lost the seat to Ness amidst the statewide Labor defeat of 1932. Connors again contested Dulwich Hill in 1935, but again lost to Ness.

Connors returned to the trade union movement after his parliamentary defeat, serving as state secretary of the Australian Society of Engineers from 1932 until 1943. He subsequently served as its federal secretary from 1943 until 1953. He remained heavily involved in Labor politics; he was expelled from the party by a special conference in 1936 and joined the left-wing splinter Industrial Labor Party. Upon the readmission of the ILP into Labor in 1939, he was elected to the Labor central executive, but in 1940 joined the State Labor Party split, serving on its executive until 1941. He rejoined the Labor Party soon after, and again served on the official Labor executive from 1942 until 1953.

Connors died in 1963, and was buried in the Roman Catholic section of Rookwood Cemetery.

References

  

1888 births
1963 deaths
Members of the New South Wales Legislative Assembly
Australian trade unionists
Australian Labor Party members of the Parliament of New South Wales
20th-century Australian politicians